7 Pieces is an album by American jazz composer and arranger Jimmy Giuffre which was released on the Verve label in 1959.

Reception

Ken Dryden of Allmusic states:

Track listing 
All compositions by Jimmy Giuffre
 "Happy Man" - 7:12
 "Lovely Willow" - 9:19
 "Song of the Wind" - 5:52
 "Princess" - 4:17
 "The Story" - 7:04
 "The Little Melody" - 7:28
 "Time Machine" - 4:38

Personnel 
Jimmy Giuffre - clarinet, tenor saxophone, baritone saxophone
Jim Hall - guitar 
Red Mitchell - bass

References 

1959 albums
Jimmy Giuffre albums
Verve Records albums